Norris is an English surname. In some cases it is derived from the Middle English                                    norreis, noreis, norais; and the Anglo-Norman French noreis. In such cases the surname derived from elements meaning "northerner", and referred to people from Norway, and northern England and Scotland. In other cases, the surname is derived from the Middle English personal name Norreis, which is in turn derived from norreis. In other cases the surname is derived from the Middle English norice, nurice; and the Old French norrice, nurrice. In such cases, the surname is derived from elements meaning "nurse", "foster parent".

Notable people

Surname

Andrea Norris, American information technology executive and civil servant
 Anthony Norris, American professional wrestler
 Ben Norris (1910–2006), American artist
 Ben Norris (actor) (born 1991/1992), British actor, playwright and poet
Ben Norris (comedian) (active 1993-), British standup comic
 Bonita Norris (born 1987), British mountain climber
 Carli Norris (born 1974), English actress
 Charles Norris (disambiguation)
 Chester E. Norris (1927–2016), American diplomat
 Christopher Norris (disambiguation)
 Chuck Norris, American actor and martial artist
 Chuck Norris (musician), American guitarist
 Clint Norris, American musician
 Craig Norris, Canadian musician and radio broadcaster
 Daniel Norris (born 1993), American baseball player
 Daran Norris, American actor
 David Norris (footballer), English association football player
 David Norris (politician), Irish civil rights campaigner and politician
 David Norris (speedway rider), English speedway rider
 Dean Norris, American actor
 Evelyn Norris, Singaporean educator
 Francis Norris, 1st Earl of Berkshire
 Frank Norris, American novelist
 Frank Norris (bishop), Anglican bishop in China
 Fred Norris, American radio personality
 Frederick Norris, British marathon runner
 Galen Norris (1915–2001), Canadian politician
 George W. Norris, member of the U.S. Congress and Senator from Nebraska
 Henry Norris (disambiguation)
 Hermione Norris, English actress
 Ina Norris, American actress
 J. Frank Norris, controversial Texas Baptist preacher
 Jacob Norris (disambiguation), several people
 James Norris (footballer) (born 2003), English football player
 James E. Norris, person after whom the James Norris Memorial Trophy in the National Hockey League is named
 James J. Norris, American advocate for refugees and recipient of UNHCR's Nansen Refugee Award
 Jared Norris, American football player
 Jesse Norris, American powerlifter
 Joanna Norris, New Zealand journalist
 John Norris (disambiguation)
 Josef Norris (born 1965), American artist
 Josh Norris, American ice hockey player for the Ottawa Senators
 Joz Norris (born 1989), British comedian
 Justin Norris, Australian swimmer
 Kathi Norris (1919–2005), American TV hostess of the 1940s and 1950s
 Kathleen Norris (1880–1966), American novelist
 Kathleen Norris (poet) (born 1947), American poet, essayist and devotional writer
 Kenneth True Norris Jr. (1930–1996), American businessman
 Lando Norris (born 1999), British-Belgian racing driver
 Lee Norris, American actor
 Lennie Norris (born 1951), English swimmer
 Leslie Norris, Welsh poet
 Luke Norris (actor) (born 1985), English actor
 Marcus Norris (born 1974), American basketball player
 Mark Norris (Canadian politician)
 Mary Norris (copy editor) (born 1952), American author, writer and copy editor
 Mary Harriott Norris, American writer and educator
 Matthew Norris South African Businessman 
 Michele Norris, American radio journalist
 Michelle Norris, first female winner of Military Cross (UK)
 Mike Norris (businessman) (born 1961), British businessman
 Mikki Norris (born 1952), American activist
 Moochie Norris, American basketball player
 Olivia Norris (born 1983), German javelin thrower
 Patrick Norris (born 1976), television director
 Paul Norris, American comic book artist
 Philetus Norris, second superintendent of Yellowstone National Park
 Ralph Norris (born 1949), Australasian business executive
 Rex Norris (disambiguation)
 Roger Norreis (died c. 1224), Abbot of Evesham
 Roy Norris (1948–2020), one of the two Toolbox Killers
 Septimus Norris, American locomotive designer
 Steven Norris, British politician
 Sylvester Norris (1572–1630), English Roman Catholic writer
 Sir Thomas Norris, British Soldier
 Tom Norris (disambiguation)
 Tony Norris, British ornithologist
 William Norris (antiquarian) (1719–1791), English clergyman and antiquarian
 Rex Norris,Famous Anglo-Indian olympic hockey player - Father of Ron Norris
 Ron Norris,Famous Anglo-Indian olympic boxer - Son of Rex Norris

Given name 
 Norris Cole, American basketball player
 Norris Coleman (born 1961), NBA forward for the Los Angeles Clippers, 1994 Israeli Basketball Premier League MVP
 Norris McWhirter, co-compiler of The Guinness Book of Records
 Norris Denton Wilson (1938–2017), known by his stage name Norro Wilson, American country music singer-songwriter

Fictional characters 
 Arthur Norris, a character in the novel Mr Norris Changes Trains by Christopher Isherwood
 Norris (Chrono Cross), a character in the PlayStation game Chrono Cross
 Norris Cole, a character in Coronation Street, a British TV soap opera
 Mrs. Norris, a character in Jane Austen's Mansfield Park
 Mrs. Norris, the pet cat of Argus Filch in the Harry Potter novels and films
 Norris Packard, a character from the Mobile Suit Gundam: The 08th MS Team OVA

References

English-language surnames